Thomas Aloysius Doyle (January 9, 1886 – January 29, 1935) was a Democratic U.S. Representative from Illinois, 1923–1931. He also served as a member of the Chicago City Council from 1914 to 1918 and from 1931 to 1935, and as a member of the Illinois House of Representatives from 1918 to 1923. He was involved in the real estate, insurance and automobile businesses.

External links
 

1886 births
1935 deaths
Chicago City Council members
Democratic Party members of the Illinois House of Representatives
Democratic Party members of the United States House of Representatives from Illinois
20th-century American politicians